Bahudarmai (Nepali: बहुदरमाई ) is a municipality in Parsa District in Province No. 2 of Nepal. It was formed in 2016 occupying current 9 sections (wards) from previous 9 former VDCs. It occupies an area of 31.55 km2 with a total population of 39,763.

Notable Place:

Bahudaramai Temple 

Dokaila Chowk 

Tilawe River Barrage

References 

Populated places in Parsa District
Nepal municipalities established in 2017
Municipalities in Madhesh Province